The 2020–21 Charlton Athletic season was the club's 115th season in their existence, after having been founded in 1905, and was their first back in League One following relegation from the Championship. Along with competing in League One, the club also participated in the FA Cup, EFL Cup and the EFL Trophy. The season covered the period from 1 August 2020 to 30 June 2021.

Squad statistics

|}

Top scorers

Disciplinary record

Transfers

Transfers in

Transfers out

Loans in

Loans out

Friendlies

Competitions

League One

League table

Result summary

Results by round

Matches
The 2020–21 season fixtures were released on Friday 21 August 2020.

FA Cup

The draw for the first round was made on Monday 26, October.

EFL Cup

The first round draw was made on 18 August, live on Sky Sports, by Paul Merson. The draw for both the second and third round were confirmed on September 6, live on Sky Sports by Phil Babb.

EFL Trophy

The regional group stage draw was confirmed on 18 August.

References

Notes

Charlton Athletic
Charlton Athletic F.C. seasons
Charlton
Charlton